Sidney Warren Nichols (April 15, 1895 – March 23, 1971) was an American football player and coach. He was a starting quarterback at the University of Illinois in 1917.

Head coaching record

References

External links
 

1895 births
1971 deaths
American football quarterbacks
Illinois Fighting Illini football players
Occidental Tigers football coaches
Rock Island Independents players
People from Creston, Iowa
Sportspeople from Des Moines, Iowa
Coaches of American football from Iowa
Players of American football from Des Moines, Iowa